Paul Alfred Coldren (August 29, 1874 – ?) was an American football player and coach.  He served as the head football coach at Washburn University from 1897 to 1898, at Simpson College in 1900, and at Augustana College in Rock Island, Illinois from 1902 to 1905, compiling a career college football record of 25–9–4.

Coaching career
Coldren was the third head football coach for Washburn University in Topeka, Kansas, and held that position for two seasons, from 1897 to 1898.  His overall coaching record at Washburn was 11–1–1.

Head coaching record

References

1874 births
Year of death missing
19th-century players of American football
Augustana (Illinois) Vikings football coaches
Iowa Hawkeyes football players
Simpson Storm football coaches
Washburn Ichabods football coaches
Players of American football from Iowa